In particle physics, a calorimeter is an experimental apparatus that measures the energy of particles.  Most particles enter the calorimeter and initiate a particle shower  and the particles' energy is deposited in the calorimeter, collected, and measured. The energy may be measured in its entirety, requiring total containment of the particle shower, or it may be sampled. Typically, calorimeters are segmented transversely to provide information about the direction of the particle or particles, as well as the energy deposited, and longitudinal segmentation can provide information about the identity of the particle based on the shape of the shower as it develops. Calorimetry design is an active area of research in particle physics.

Types of calorimeters

Electromagnetic versus hadronic

(See types of particle showers for the differences between the two.) The response of a calorimeter can be described in terms of the e/h ratio. This is the measure of how well a calorimeter responds to leptons or photons versus hadrons. Ideally one would want a ratio e/h~1, this condition is called compensation.

Homogeneous versus sampling
Either of the above types can be made as a sampling calorimeter or a homogeneous calorimeter.

Calorimeters in high-energy physics experiments
Most particle physics experiments use some form of calorimetry. Often it is the most practical way to detect and measure neutral particles from an interaction. In addition, calorimeters are necessary for calculating "missing energy" which can be attributed to particles that rarely interact with matter and escape the detector, such as neutrinos. In most experiments the calorimeter works in conjunction with other components like a central tracker and a muon detector.  All the detector components work together to achieve the objective of reconstructing a physics event.

See also
 Calorimeter (for other uses of the term)
 Total absorption spectroscopy, a technique whose main measuring device is a calorimeter

References

External links
 Calorimeter section of The Particle Detector BriefBook
 Explanation of Calorimeters on Quantumdiaries.org

Particle detectors